HaAh HaGadol 7 (lit. The Big Brother 7) is the seventh season of the Israeli version of the reality show Big Brother. The season began broadcasting on 16 December 2015. 16 housemates entered the house during the premiere. This season had a Timebomb theme, like Big Brother 16 (UK).

Following the departure of co-host Assi Azar, he was replaced by female host Korin Gideon beginning this season, along with veteran host Erez Tal.

Housemates

Arbel
Arbel Kaynan   22, Tel Aviv. Entered the house on Day 25.

Barak 
Barak Edri  25, Tzora.

Corinne 
Corinne "Coco" Abisdris  29, Jerusalem.

Dudu 
Dudu Cohen  33, Afula.

Esti-Lee 
Esti-Lee Paz  29, Udim. Entered the house on Day 53.

Flory 

Flory Elkaslassi  38, Ramla.

Gil 
Gil Almog  27, Tel Aviv.

Gili 

Gili Cohen  42, Holon.

Ilana 

Ilana Kaspov  54, Nahariya.

Itzik 
Itzik "Carlos" Carasenti  46,  Haifa. Entered the house on Day 53.

Ksenia 

Ksenia Tarantul  28, Lod (originally from Russia).

Michael 

Michael "Mikey" Elroy  25, Tel Aviv.

Omer 

Omer Kaynan  22, Tel Aviv.

Omri 

Omri Ben-Natan  29, Ramat Gan.

Or 

Or Sujunov  35, Tel Aviv, (originally from New York City).

Rinat 
Rinat Fleischer  45, Rishon LeZion. Entered the house on Day 53.

Salim 

Salim Marei  40, Tel Aviv.

Shahar 
Shahar Hefetz  35, Gedera. Entered the house on Day 53.

Shai H. 

Shai Hai  32, Herzliya.

Shay M. 

Shay Mika Ifrah  23, Katzrin.

Tamar 

Tamar Shiloh  30, Tel Aviv.

Tania 

Tania "Tani" Gerber  23, Herzliya. Entered the house on Day 25.

Nominations table

Notes 

 Dudu, as the first to enter in the house, had to choose various positions for the housemates, which would have consequences. Throughout the first week the positions could be changed, and in the end, Shay H. has to always nominate publicly, Gil and Gili will compete as a 2-in-1 housemate, Dudu is automatically nominated forever and Barak won immunity to the end of the season, meaning he is the first finalist.
 Every week, Big Brother will host a Big Brother Games in the Time Room where the tenant who is up for eviction will have the opportunity to save themselves and add another tenant instead of them.
 All housemates were on eviction list because some of them refused to perform in a public vote that took place prior to the week 3 task.
 Despite the victory of Coco in Big Brother Games, the housemates were informed that an error was discovered in the vote, therefore, she is no longer immune.
 Prior to week 5 task the housemates were divided into groups: group Red and group Blue and compete in missions. In the last mission, the group (Red) that lost is up for evection and the group (Blue) that won were immune.
 Since Ksenia was in team Red she was nominated but she won Big Brother Games, and became immune and she put Flory who was in team Blue and was originally immune up for eviction instead of her.
 Big Brother informed the housemates that Saturday nights eviction will be double and For the first time in the history of Big Brother who decides who are the two housemates to leave the house, they are none other than new housemates entering Saturday, however, the housemates don't know that this eviction is false and part of week 8 task Sherlock Holmes.
 The housemates nominated face-to-face.
 Arbel Kaynan sprained her ankle after she stumbled earlier in the day, Arbel received immediate medical treatment at Hadassah Hospital in Jerusalem and her leg was put in a cast but in view of her medical condition she is not able to continue the program, after 52 days Arbel decided to leave the house.
 Due to Omri breaking the China Wall that was made during week/task 10, Big Brother informed the housemates that there will be Serious implications, all housemates are up to eviction and the budget will be cut 30% until the end of the season, in addition, this week there is no Big Brother Games.
 As part of the week 11 task family members of housemates attended the house in order to the housemates to succeed in the task and earn an extra budget of 20%, they had to replace positions given at the beginning of the season. Now Itzik has to always nominate publicly, Shay H. is automatically nominated forever and Dudu won immunity to the end of the season, meaning he is the first official finalist.
 On Day 86, Shay Hay intentionally kicked art installation made by housemate Or Sujunov after claims of Boycott and allegations of verbal abuse from the housemates towards Shay Hay, Tania and Itzik, Shay Hay asked to leave the house and Big Brother agreed to the request (had Shay Hay didn't request to leave he would have been required to leave the house anyway because he violated the format's rules for the second time). Following the departure of Shay Hay, his partner Tania and his friend Itzik also departed the house. Following these events, for the first time ever, Big Brother finale will have only 4 finalists.
 As of week 13 there will be no longer Big Brother Games.

Nominations totals received

References

External links
  

2015 Israeli television seasons
2016 Israeli television seasons
07
Entertainment scandals